Ghiyasuddin A'zam Shah was the third Sultan of Bengal and the Ilyas Shahi dynasty. He was one of the most prominent medieval Bengali sultans. He established diplomatic relations with the Ming Empire of China, pursued cultural contacts with leading thinkers in Persia and conquered Assam.

Reign

Ghiyasuddin Azam Shah became the Sultan of Bengal after his own forces overthrew and killed his father Sultan Sikandar Shah at the Battle of Goalpara in 1390, despite Azam Shah ordering them not to kill his father.
During the early part of his reign, he conquered and occupied Kamarupa in modern-day Assam. His interests included establishing an independent judiciary and fostering Persianate and Bengali culture. 

He also had a profound regard for law. A story about him and a qazi is very famous as a folktale and moral story. Once, the sultan while hunting accidentally killed the son of a poor widow with his arrow. The widow appeared before a qazi and brought a charge of murder against the sultan. Ghiyasuddin Azam Shah was summoned by the Qazi, and appeared before the court like an ordinary accused person. Many people had gathered there to see a case against the sultan of the country. The sultan obeyed the law and gave indemnity to the poor widow for killing her son. When the trial was over the Qazi stood up and praised the sultan for his regard for the law.

Then the sultan said that he would have instantly beheaded the qazi if he faltered in his judgment. The qazi smiled and said that he would have flayed his majesty's back with a whip if he had not obeyed the law. Sultan Ghiyasuddin embraced the brave qazi, and the whole crowd shouted in their honour.

Diplomatic and regional affairs
The Sultan pioneered diplomatic relations with China by sending embassies to the Ming dynasty court in Peking. He exchanged envoys and gifts with the Yongle Emperor. Bengal was interested in establishing a strategic partnership with China to counter the influence of its neighbors, including the Delhi Sultanate. The Chinese mediated in several regional disputes. The Sultan also built strong relations with the Sultanate of Jaunpur in North India. He sent envoys to the Hejaz and financed the construction of madrasas in Mecca and Medina.

Literary patron
Ghiyasuddin was a patron of scholars and poets. Among others, the Persian poet Hafez kept correspondences with him. One of the earliest Muslim Bengali poet, Shah Muhammad Sagir, who was a poet-laureate of Ghiyasuddin, wrote his famous work, Yusuf-Zulekha at the request of the Sultan. The Hindu poet, Krittibas Ojha, also translated the Ramayana in Bengali as Krittivasi Ramayan during his reign.

See also
 List of rulers of Bengal

References

Sultans of Bengal
1411 deaths
Year of birth unknown
15th-century Indian monarchs
Ilyas Shahi dynasty